Pachehlak may refer to:
Pachehlak-e Gharbi Rural District
Pachehlak-e Sharqi Rural District